Lilium philippinense, commonly known as the Benguet lily, or Philippine lily, is a lily, native to Taiwan and to the Cordillera region, primarily to the province of Benguet, in the northern Philippines.

Description

The plant's flowers are white trumpet-shaped, known to emit a fragrant odor.

Conservation status
Lilium philippinense is endangered and is known to thrive only in high altitudes of the Cordillera Central mountains. In August 2013, the Baguio City Environment and Parks Management Office personnel had successfully raised the lilies for six months at the city's Botanical Garden.

References

philippinense
Flora of the Philippines
Flora of Taiwan
Plants described in 1873